The Junkers S 36 was a twin-engine mail plane developed in Germany in the late 1920s that was further developed in Sweden as a multi-role military aircraft, albeit unsuccessfully, under the designation K 37. The design itself was a low-wing cantilever monoplane of largely conventional design, featuring twin tails and fixed, tailwheel undercarriage. Construction was metal throughout and skinned, in typical Junkers fashion, with corrugated duralumin. The engines were mounted in nacelles on the wings, and the crew was accommodated in three open cockpits, including one in the very nose of the aircraft.

Design and development
This design lent itself readily to military applications, and the open cockpit in the nose offered an ideal position for a crewman to act as an observer, bombardier and/or nose gunner. The S 36 prototype was flown to Sweden, where it was militarised by Junkers subsidiary AB Flygindustri at Limhamn. Proposed as a fighter or reconnaissance-bomber, the K 37 could operate at altitudes unattainable by other fighters of the day, rendering it effectively immune from interception. The type was demonstrated in civil form at the "Aerial Garden Party" at Heston Aerodrome in July 1929, and in military form as a model at the Olympia Aero Show, complete with a dummy observer with swivelling machine gun to demonstrate the field of fire.

No sales resulted, and the development of new and more capable fighter aircraft negated the advantages offered by the type. However, the Japanese Army Air Force was sufficiently interested in the type for Mitsubishi to purchase manufacturing rights in 1931, and AB Flygindustri also provided one or two pattern aircraft. A K 37 was operated with success during the Invasion of Manchuria and led the Army to order heavy and light bombers from Mitsubishi based on the design. These were developed as the Ki-1 and Ki-2 respectively, the former sharing little with the Junkers design other than its general configuration, but the latter featuring wings essentially the same as the K 37 fitted with extra ailerons.

Specifications (K 37)

References

Bibliography

 
 Hugo Junkers homepage
 Уголок неба
 
 

1920s German mailplanes
K 37
Low-wing aircraft
Aircraft first flown in 1927
Twin piston-engined tractor aircraft